1700 Zvezdara, provisional designation , is a dark asteroid from the inner regions of the asteroid belt, approximately 21 kilometers in diameter. It was discovered on 27 August 1940, by Serbian astronomer Petar Đurković at Belgrade Astronomical Observatory, Serbia, and named after the Zvezdara hill in Belgrade.

Orbit and classification 

The asteroid orbits the Sun in the inner main-belt at a distance of 1.8–2.9 AU once every 3 years and 8 months (1,325 days). Its orbit has an eccentricity of 0.23 and an inclination of 5° with respect to the ecliptic.

Physical characteristics 

Zvezdara is characterized as an X-type asteroid in the Tholen classification.

Lightcurves 

In September 2009, two rotational lightcurves of Zvezdara were obtained from observations, after being identified as a good candidate for photometry. They gave an identical rotation period of 9.114 hours with a brightness variation of 0.10 and 0.13 magnitude, respectively.

Diameter and albedo 

According to the survey carried out by the Japanese Akari satellite and NASA's Wide-field Infrared Survey Explorer with its subsequent NEOWISE mission, Zvezdara measures 20.17 and 21.71 kilometers in diameter and its surface has an albedo of 0.045 and 0.039, respectively. The Collaborative Asteroid Lightcurve Link derives an albedo of 0.043 and a diameter of 20.86 kilometers based on an absolute magnitude of 12.45, similar to one of the lightcurve studies that calculated a diameter of 20.89 kilometers.

Naming 

This minor planet is named after the hilly Zvezdara municipality of the city of Belgrade. It is the location of the Belgrade Observatory, founded in 1934. The Serbian word Zvezdara means "star-house" when literally translated. Zvezdara was one of two asteroids discovered by Petar Đurković, the other being 1605 Milankovitch. The official naming citation was published by the Minor Planet Center on 1 August 1980.

Notes

References

External links 
 Asteroid Lightcurve Database (LCDB), query form (info )
 Dictionary of Minor Planet Names, Google books
 Asteroids and comets rotation curves, CdR – Observatoire de Genève, Raoul Behrend
 Discovery Circumstances: Numbered Minor Planets (1)-(5000) – Minor Planet Center
 
 

 

001700
Discoveries by Petar Đurković
Named minor planets
001700
19400826